"Just Another Day" is a song by Cuban-American singer-songwriter Jon Secada. It was released in March 1992 as the lead single from his self-titled debut album (1992). Written by Secada and Miguel Morejon, the song reached number five on the US Billboard Hot 100 and number two on the Adult Contemporary chart. It also peaked at number one in Sweden, at number two in Canada, and at number five in the United Kingdom and New Zealand. The song was also recorded in Spanish as "Otro día más sin verte", which topped the US Billboard Hot Latin Tracks chart, peaked at number one in Panama and Uruguay, and reached the top-five in Colombia, El Salvador and Mexico. Gloria Estefan sings background vocals on the song and is given writing credit for the Spanish-language version.

Music videos
Two different music videos were made for this song: a first, which presents Secada in the city; and a second, which presents him singing with his band in a black and white sequence. In both videos, the final scene features Secada who is singing in the rain.  In the black and white video version near the end, Gloria Estefan appears, singing the song. Both videos used the shorter version of this song.

Track listings
US CD single (K2-19748)
 "Just Another Day" (English edit) – 4:15	
 "Just Another Day" (Spanglish edit) – 4:15
 "Just Another Day" (Spanish edit) – 4:15
 "Just Another Day" (dance mix) – 5:42
 "Always Something" (live—recorded in Rotterdam, Holland, May 10, 1991) – 4:13

UK CD single (CDSBK35)
 "Just Another Day" (English edit) – 4:15
 "Just Another Day" (Spanglish edit) – 4:15
 "Just Another Day" (dance mix) – 4:15
 "Always Something" (live) – 4:13

Further releases
"Just Another Day" was released with further versions. In 2009, Bernie Williams released it on the album Moving Forward featuring vocals from Secada. Secada released a new version in 2017 featuring Gyptian and a separate reggae version tiled "Just Another Day (Reggae version)". In 2018, Secada released a new Spanish version "Otro Dia Mas Sin Verte" with Los Fab 90's.

Charts

Weekly charts

"Just Another Day"

"Otro día más sin verte"

Year-end charts

Sales and certifications

Release history

See also
 Lo Nuestro Award for Video of the Year

References

1992 debut singles
1992 songs
Jon Secada songs
Number-one singles in Sweden
SBK Records singles
Song recordings produced by Emilio Estefan
Songs written by Jon Secada
Songs written by Miguel A. Morejon